Rabindra Kumar Patel (born 1970) is an Indian politician affiliated with the 	Apna Dal (Sonelal) party. He has a master's degree in Medical (MBBS MS) from IMS-BHU at Varanasi.

He was elected as a Member of the Legislative Assembly for the Mariyahu constituency of the Legislature of Uttar Pradesh in Jaunpur in 2022.

References 

Uttar Pradesh politicians
1970 births
Living people
Uttar Pradesh MLAs 2022–2027
People from Jaunpur district